The South Beach Street Historic District is a U.S. historic district (designated as such on September 15, 1988) located in Daytona Beach, Florida. The district is bounded by Volusia Avenue, South Beach Street, South Street, and U.S. 1. It contains 154 historic buildings.

Gallery

References

External links

 Volusia County listings at National Register of Historic Places

National Register of Historic Places in Volusia County, Florida
Historic districts on the National Register of Historic Places in Florida
Buildings and structures in Daytona Beach, Florida